Garland dancing is an English dance tradition that began in the 19th century in North England's mill towns.

The Industrial Revolution was centralizing people, bringing rural folk to factory work. As country girls moved to new industrial cities, they brought with them dancing traditions from many rural areas. Garland dancing was a new combination of familiar movements, made more picturesque by flower-covered garlands. Mill owners encouraged garland dancing as a form of healthful exercise that also brought beauty to company events and town parades.

See also
Morris dance

English folk dance